Ivan Baron (born November 12, 1972) is a former professional tennis player from the United States.

Career
Baron was a top ranked 18s player in the United States and had his best year on the junior circuit in 1990, when he won the Italian Open, reached the quarter-finals at the French Open and the semi-finals at Wimbledon.

At the 1990 US Open, in addition to appearing in the boys' singles draw, Baron took part in the men's singles, men's doubles and mixed doubles. A wildcard entrant, Baron lost in straight sets to Fabrice Santoro in the singles. He partnered Michael Flanagan and Lisa Raymond in the doubles draws but was also unable to make it past the opening round in either.

When he returned to the US Open main draw in 1993, it was as a qualifier. He lost in four sets to Renzo Furlan in the first round and also exited in the first round of the doubles, partnering Michael Joyce. In the 1994 US Open, Baron appeared only in the doubles, with Martin Blackman. They lost in the opening round.	
 
Baron had a win over then world number 11, Magnus Larsson, at the 1995 International Tennis Championships, in Coral Springs. He and Brett Hansen-Dent were doubles runners-up at the same event the following year.

ATP career finals

Doubles: 1 (0–1)

Challenger titles

Doubles: (3)

References

1972 births
Living people
American male tennis players
People from Plantation, Florida
Sportspeople from Jacksonville, Florida
Tennis people from Florida
Sportspeople from Broward County, Florida
20th-century American people
21st-century American people